Scopula argillina is a moth of the family Geometridae. It was described by Oswald Bertram Lower in 1915. It is endemic to Australia.

References

Moths described in 1915
argillina
Endemic fauna of Australia
Moths of Australia